Dayr Abu Salama was a small Palestinian Arab village in the Ramle Subdistrict, located 8 km northeast of Ramla. It was depopulated during the 1948 Arab–Israeli War on July 13, 1948, in the first phase of Operation Dani.

History
In 1882  the PEF's Survey of Western Palestine (SWP) noted at Deir Abu Salameh: "Foundations, heaps of stones, and a few pillar shafts."

British Mandate era
In the 1922 census of Palestine conducted  by the British Mandate authorities, Dair Abu Salameh  had a population of 30  inhabitants; all Muslims, 

In the 1945 statistics, it had a population of 60 Muslims with 1,195 dunams of land.  Of this, 41 dunams  were either irrigated or used for orchards, 695 used for cereals, while 459 dunams were classified as non-cultivable areas.

A shrine for a local sage known as al-Shaykh Abu Salama is also located in the village.

1948, aftermath
Dayr Abu Salama was depopulated during the 1948 Arab–Israeli War on July 13, 1948, in the first phase of Operation Dani.

In 1992 the village site was described: "The site has been converted into an Israeli picnic area and is surrounded by stands of pine and cypress trees. Workers for the Jewish National Fund have used stones retrieved from the destroyed village houses to construct a watchtower and an amphitheater on the village site. The area in front of the amphitheater has been leveled and is covered by a green lawn. Old fig and olive trees still grow there; cactuses and carob trees grow on the western and northern edges of the site."

References

Bibliography

External links
 Welcome To Dayr Abu Salama
Dayr Abu Salama,  Zochrot
Survey of Western Palestine, Map 14:   IAA,  Wikimedia commons  

Arab villages depopulated during the 1948 Arab–Israeli War
District of Ramla